Paint Lick is an unincorporated community in Garrard County, Kentucky, United States.  It lies along Routes 21 and 52 east of the city of Lancaster, the county seat of Garrard County. In 2015, a new route for KY 52 opened, bypassing the town. Its elevation is 820 feet (250 m).  It has a post office with the ZIP code 40461. Historic sites within the community include Paint Lick Presbyterian Church (1879).

Paint Lick has been noted for its unusual place name.

Education
Paint Lick is served by the Garrard County Schools. Paint Lick Elementary School is located in the community.

References

Unincorporated communities in Garrard County, Kentucky
Unincorporated communities in Kentucky